Vodice pri Slivnici is a small settlement west of Slivnica in the Municipality of Šentjur, eastern Slovenia. The settlement, and the entire municipality, are included in the Savinja Statistical Region, which is in the Slovenian portion of the historical Duchy of Styria.

Name
The name of the settlement was changed from Vodice to Vodice pri Slivnici in 1953.

References

External links
Vodice pri Slivnici at Geopedia

Populated places in the Municipality of Šentjur